Brent Aaron Clevlen (born October 27, 1983) is an American former professional baseball outfielder who played parts of four major leagues seasons with the Detroit Tigers and Atlanta Braves.

Personal life
Clevlen graduated from Westwood High School in 2002.  He is married.

Major leagues
Clevlen was a 2nd-round pick by the Detroit Tigers in the 2002 first-year player draft..In 2005, Clevlen was named the Tigers minor league players of the year while playing for Lakeland. He made his Major League debut on July 30, 2006, in a 6–4 loss to the Minnesota Twins. He started at center field in his first game. His first catch in the field was intended to be a sacrifice fly by Minnesota catcher Joe Mauer, but ended up being an inning-ending double play, as Clevlen threw out Luis Castillo at home plate. In his first MLB at bat, he doubled off Twins ace Johan Santana.

On August 1, 2006, in his second Major League game, Clevlen hit his first major league home run against the Tampa Bay Devil Rays in the 5th inning off pitcher Travis Harper. He later added another home run in the 9th inning off pitcher Ruddy Lugo going 3-for-5 for the night, with 3 runs scored and 2 RBI.

Clevlen was optioned down to the Tiger's AAA-affiliate Toledo Mud Hens later in the 2006 season as Alexis Gómez emerged as a valuable bench player.  Tigers manager Jim Leyland has stated that Clevlen would benefit from playing every day in Toledo, and remains second in the team's depth chart for center field.  Following the season, Clevlen was named the third-best prospect and rated as possessing the best outfield arm in the Tigers' organization by Baseball America.

In 2007, Brent was called up when the Detroit Tigers expanded their rosters.

In 2008, Clevlen was called up in place of injured Clete Thomas, but returned to Toledo when Thomas was reactivated.

On July 31, 2010, he played in four games for the Atlanta Braves and then was designated for assignment and became a free agent at the end of the season.

Clevlen was to start the season with the independent Wichita Wingnuts of the American Association, but was purchased by the Cincinnati Reds on May 9, 2011. He was returned to Wichita after playing in 26 games for Triple-A Louisville. After playing in 46 games for Wichita, Clevlen was purchased by the Philadelphia Phillies and was assigned to Double-A Reading. In all of 2011 (104 games), Clevlen hit .303 with 19 HR and 62 RBI.

On April 19, 2012, Clevlen signed a minor league deal with the Arizona Diamondbacks, and was assigned to Double-A Mobile. He also spent time at Triple-A Reno. He also began 2013 in the Diamondbacks organization, splitting time with Mobile and Reno before being released. Over those 2 seasons (152 games), Clevlen hit .265 with 19 HR and 77 RBI in 523 PA.

On June 17, 2013 Clevlen returned to Wichita.  He continued to play with Wichita in 2014 and became the American Association MVP with a slash line of .372/.447/.647   and signed with the Puebla Pericos of Liga Mexicano de Beisbol for the 2015 season.

On February 25, 2016, Clevlen signed with the Wichita Wingnuts of the American Association of Independent Professional Baseball.

On November 16, 2018, Clevlen was announced at the manager of the Cleburne Railroaders (American Association of Independent Professional Baseball). On December 17, 2020, after two years as the manager, Clevlen was replaced by Mike Jeffcoat.

References

External links

1983 births
Living people
Algodoneros de Guasave players
American expatriate baseball players in Mexico
Atlanta Braves players
Baseball players from Austin, Texas
Detroit Tigers players
Erie SeaWolves players
Estrellas Orientales players
American expatriate baseball players in the Dominican Republic
Gulf Coast Tigers players
Gwinnett Braves players
Lakeland Tigers players
Leones del Escogido players
Louisville Bats players
Major League Baseball outfielders
Mexican League baseball outfielders
Mobile BayBears players
Pericos de Puebla players
Phoenix Desert Dogs players
Reading Phillies players
Rome Braves players
Reno Aces players
Toledo Mud Hens players
West Michigan Whitecaps players
Wichita Wingnuts players